Huffman Distillery and Chopping Mill is a historic complex of buildings in Somerset Township, Washington County, Pennsylvania. Contributing buildings include a c. 1810 -story four-bay brick main house; a c. 1815 timber-frame bank barn; a c.1790 stone-and-log distillery, and a c. 1805 timber-frame chopping mill.  The mill was horse powered, and was used to chop grain for the distilling process.  These buildings are a rare surviving example of an important industry in the Somerset Township area, and the very small-scale industrial/commercial enterprises of the late 18th/early 19th centuries.  The area had a high concentration of distillers, and they were greatly affected by the whiskey excise tax and the Whiskey Rebellion.

Huffman Distillery and Chopping Millis designated as a historic residential landmark/farmstead by the Washington County History & Landmarks Foundation, and is listed on the National Register of Historic Places.

References

Houses on the National Register of Historic Places in Pennsylvania
Grinding mills in Pennsylvania
Houses in Washington County, Pennsylvania
1790 establishments in Pennsylvania
National Register of Historic Places in Washington County, Pennsylvania
Grinding mills on the National Register of Historic Places in Pennsylvania
Distilleries in Pennsylvania
Distilleries on the National Register of Historic Places